"Wildstorm: Armageddon" was a crossover event in the Wildstorm Universe, written by Christos Gage and drawn by various artists.

Armageddon led into a number of bi-weekly series, Wildstorm: Revelations and Number of the Beast, which resulted in the relaunch of a number of Wildstorm titles.

Issues
The issues were:

 "Midnighter: Armageddon" (art by Simon Coleby)
 "Welcome to Tranquility: Armageddon" (art by Horacio Domingues/Neil Googe)
 "Wetworks: Armageddon" (art by Brandon Badeaux)
 "Gen¹³: Armageddon" (pencils by JonBoy Meyers and inks by Tony Washington
 "Stormwatch: Post Human Division: Armageddon" (with pencils by Leandro Fernandez and inks by Francisco Paronzini)
 "Wildcats: Armageddon" (with art by Talent Caldwell)

Collected editions
The titles were brought together into a trade paperback:

 Wildstorm: Armageddon (144 pages, Titan Books, May 2008, DC Comics, April 2008)

Notes

References

External links
Gage Takes Wildstorm: Talking Midnighter: Armageddon & Authority: Prime, Newsarama, July 16, 2007
Armageddon Man: Christos Gage on Wildstorm: Armageddon, Newsarama, December 10, 2007